Helen Hayes Hospital is a 155-bed physical rehabilitation hospital in West Haverstraw, New York, owned and operated by the New York State Department of Health. Established by Dr. Newton Schaffer in 1900 as a physical rehabilitation hospital for children, it is considered to be one of the first freestanding state-operated physical rehabilitation hospitals in the United States. The hospital was renamed in 1974 after celebrated stage and screen actress Helen Hayes MacArthur, who served on the hospital's Board of Visitors for 49 years until her death in 1993. The hospital is a member of the NewYork-Presbyterian Healthcare System.

The modern hospital provides rehabilitation on an inpatient and outpatient basis for individuals of all ages with a wide array of disabilities and conditions, including spinal cord injury, stroke, traumatic brain injury, cardiac and pulmonary disorders, amputations, joint replacements, osteoporosis, Parkinson’s disease, multiple sclerosis, ALS, cerebral palsy and other neurological disorders. The hospital also provides pediatric rehabilitation for children with physical and cognitive disabilities and developmental delays.

Helen Hayes Hospital is also home to The Center for Rehabilitation Technology, a center for advanced adaptive technology, and the Smart Apartment, a working replica of a home outfitted with adaptive technology for home life.

History 

The hospital was established in 1900 by Dr. Newton M. Shaffer as the New York State Hospital for the Care of Indigent Crippled and Deformed Children.  Then located in Tarrytown, NY, it was one of the first state-run freestanding rehabilitation hospitals and offered services to children aged 3 to 15 in New York State whose parents were not able to pay for private treatment. The hospital, located in a commodious house on the banks of the Hudson River, first opened its doors to patients on December 5, 1900. The original hospital had accommodations for 25-30 children who lived full-time at the facility while receiving treatment. Admission to the hospital was in high demand among poor families who had children suffering from spinal disease, hip-joint diseases, infantile paralysis, and other conditions.

In April 1905, the New York State Hospital for the Care of Crippled and Deformed Children was relocated to West Haverstraw in Rockland County, NY. The new hospital housed and cared for approximately 50 children in a residence that boasted views of the Hudson River.

In 1923, during the Polio epidemic, the hospital was renamed The New York State Orthopedic Hospital for Children. In 1929, it became the New York State Reconstruction Home. In 1945, during World War II, the hospital lifted its age restrictions and began to admit patients over the age of 21.

Two more name changes would occur in the coming years—to New York State Rehabilitation Hospital in 1948 and New York State Rehabilitation and Research Hospital 1972—until the hospital was renamed for the final time in 1974 as Helen Hayes Hospital, in honor of Helen Hayes, the actress of stage and screen who devoted much time and money to the institution.

References

Hospitals in New York (state)
New York State Department of Health